Bhelupur may refer to:

 Bhelupur, Buxar district, a village in Buxar district in Bihar
 Bhelupur, Varanasi, suburban neighborhood located in south of Varanasi district